Adrian Łyszczarz (born 22 August 1999) is a Polish professional footballer who plays as a midfielder for Ekstraklasa club Śląsk Wrocław.

References

External links

1999 births
Living people
People from Oleśnica
Polish footballers
Poland youth international footballers
Association football midfielders
Śląsk Wrocław players
GKS Katowice players
Ekstraklasa players
I liga players
II liga players
III liga players